The first level of country subdivisions of Iran are the provinces (ostānhā).

Each province is further subdivided into counties called shahrestan, and each county (or shahrestan) is subdivided into districts called bakhsh. There are usually a few cities and rural districts called dehestan in each district (or bakhsh). Rural districts are a collection of a number of villages. One of the cities of the county is appointed as the capital of the county.

According to the Statistical Center of Iran, the figures are as follows,  (end of Iranian calendar 1394):

Guide
The total population of a province is the total of its counties.

The total population of a county is the total of its districts.

The total population of a district is the total of its cities and rural districts.

To better understand these subdivisions, the following table for Sepidan County in Fars province (as it existed in 2006) is an example showing the hierarchy of a county's divisions:

See also
 Ostan (Geography) 
 -stan
 -abad

References and notes 

 
Iran
Government of Iran